The Achang, also known as the Ngac'ang (their own name) is an ethnic group.They are one of tibeto burman language speaking people. They form one of the 56 ethnic groups officially recognized by the People's Republic of China. They also live in Myanmar, where they're known as Maingtha in Shan State and Ngochang in Kachin State.

The Achang number 27,700, of whom 27,600 are from Yunnan province, mainly in Lianghe County of Dehong Autonomous Prefecture. The Achang speak a Burmish (Burmese-related) language called Achang, but there is no indigenous writing system to accompany it.  Chinese characters are often used instead. Many Achang also speak the Tai Lü language, mainly to make commercial transactions with Dai people.

Speaking a distinct dialect, the Husa Achang (戶撒) living in Longchuan County (also in Dehong) consider themselves to be distinct and filed  an unsuccessful application in the 1950s as a separate nationality. The Husa were more Sinicized than other Achang. For example, Confucian-styled ancestral memorial tablets are common in Husa homes. Most traditional Husa believe in a mixture of Theravada Buddhism and Taoism.

History 
The Achang are descendants of the Qiang tribes that 2,000 years ago inhabited the border region between Sichuan, Gansu and Sichuan provinces. The Achang people lived in the Yunlong area during the Yuan dynasty (1271–1268 AD). The Achang people are considered to be one of Yunnan's earliest inhabitants. Their leader Zaogai made a rule in which the tribe leader could only be succeeded by the oldest son of the former leader. The Achang community became stronger and began to have trade relationships with other kingdoms like Jinchi and Bo. The Achang were descendants of the Xunchuan people during the Tang dynasty. In the 16th year of the reign of Emperor Honghu during the Ming dynasty (1383 AD), under the leadership of Zuona, the Achang people pledged allegiance to the emperor of the Ming dynasty. During Hongwu period, Duanbo from the Han nationality was appointed the governor of Yunlong Region, and from then on the Achang ethnic group was degraded and at the same time they began to move to live in Dehong region in the southwest and as a result lost their home native land. Today more than 90 percent of the 33,936 Achangs live in Longchuan, Lianghe and Luxi counties in the Dehong Dai-Jingpo Autonomous Prefecture in southwestern Yunnan Province. The rest live in Longling County in the neighboring Baoshan Prefecture.

Culture 
A great part of the history and  traditions of the Achang has been transmitted from generation to generation through music and songs. Music is one of the mainstays of their culture, and they usually  finish all celebrations with songs and dances.
Unmarried young people usually comb their hair with two braids that gather on their head. The typical clothes of the Achang vary according to village. Married women dress in long skirts, whereas unmarried women wear trousers.
The men usually use the colors blue, or black to make their shirts, buttoned to a side. Unmarried men surround their head with a fabric of white color, whereas married men wear blue.
In Buddhist funerals of the Achang, a long fabric tape of about 20 meters is tied to the coffin. During the ceremony, the monk in charge of the ritual, walks in front as opposed to holding the tape. By doing this, the monk helps directs the soul of the deceased so that the soul of the deceased arrives at its final destiny. The deceased is buried without any metallic elements, not even jewels, since it is believed that those elements contaminate the soul for future reincarnation.

References

External links

"Achang Minority"
 http://www.ethnic-china.com/Achang/achangindex.htm
 http://www.china.org.cn/e-groups/shaoshu/shao-achang.htm (Chinese government site)

Ethnic groups officially recognized by China
Ethnic groups in Myanmar
Ethnic groups in Yunnan